Tetyana Andrushchenko or Tanya Andryuschenko (born 6 September 1977) is a road cyclist from Ukraine. She represented her nation at the 2001 UCI Road World Championships and 2002 UCI Road World Championships. She became Ukrainian national time trial champion in 2001.

References

External links
 profile at Cyclingarchives.com

1977 births
Ukrainian female cyclists
Living people